|-
|Idbar
|Konjic
|Herzegovina-Neretva Canton
|-
|Ilidža
|Ilidža
|Sarajevo Canton
|-
|Ilijaš
|Ilijaš
|Herzegovina-Neretva Canton
|-
|Ilino
|
|
|-
|Ilovača
|Goražde
|
|}

Lists of settlements in the Federation of Bosnia and Herzegovina (A-Ž)